Aleksander Šeliga (born 1 February 1980) is a former Slovenian footballer who played as a goalkeeper.

Club career

Early career
Šeliga played most of his career for hometown club Celje in the Slovenian PrvaLiga. With this club, he also participated in the UEFA Cup. In 2005, he joined Slavia Prague, but after an unsuccessful period with the Czech side, he returned to Celje.

Sparta Rotterdam
In the summer of 2009, Šeliga was tested by two clubs in the Netherlands. The first club, SC Heerenveen, was in desperate need for a keeper. After training with the side, he did not get a contract. The second club where he tried his luck was Sparta Rotterdam. The club also needed a keeper, after Cássio Ramos returned to PSV Eindhoven after an ended loan-period. After a brief internship, Šeliga signed a contract for two years. In his first season with Sparta (2009–10), he was chosen as first keeper by a manager Frans Adelaar.

International career
Šeliga earned his only appearance for the senior Slovenian national team on 3 March 2010, after taking the field as a substitute in an international friendly against Qatar in Maribor, which Slovenia had subsequently won 4–1.

Honours
Celje
Slovenian Cup: 2004–05

Olimpija
Slovenian Championship: 2015–16

References

External links

Player profile at NZS 

1980 births
Living people
Sportspeople from Celje
Slovenian footballers
Slovenia youth international footballers
Slovenia under-21 international footballers
Slovenia international footballers
Association football goalkeepers
NK Celje players
Slovenian expatriate footballers
Slovenian expatriate sportspeople in the Czech Republic
Expatriate footballers in the Czech Republic
Czech First League players
Slovenian PrvaLiga players
SK Slavia Prague players
Slovenian expatriate sportspeople in the Netherlands
Expatriate footballers in the Netherlands
Eredivisie players
Sparta Rotterdam players
NK Olimpija Ljubljana (2005) players
NK Drava Ptuj (2004) players
2010 FIFA World Cup players